India is a country in South Asia. It is made up of 28 states and 8 union territories. 6 states have adopted their own state mottos, while 20 states and 6 union territories use national motto of India as their state mottos. 2 states (Bihar and Uttar Pradesh) and 2 union territories (Chandigarh and Lakshadweep) have no official state mottos.

States
India Satyamev Jayate situated at sarnath.

Union territories

Autonomous administrative divisions
Some of the autonomous administrative divisions established by the Sixth Schedule of the Constitution of India have adopted their own motto.

See also
Satyameva Jayate, the national motto of India
 List of Indian state symbols
 List of Indian state flags
 List of Indian state emblems
 List of Indian state songs
 List of Indian state foundation days
 List of Indian state animals
 List of Indian state birds
 List of Indian state flowers
 List of Indian state trees

References

India states
Indian culture-related lists
Mottos